The 2022 UConn Huskies football team represented the University of Connecticut (UConn) in the 2022 NCAA Division I FBS football season. The Huskies played their home games at Pratt & Whitney Stadium at Rentschler Field in East Hartford, Connecticut, and competed as an FBS independent. They were led by first-year head coach Jim L. Mora.

On November 12, the Huskies defeated the Liberty Flames 36–33 to become bowl eligible for the first time since 2015.

Previous season
The Huskies finished the 2021 season 1–11.

On September 5, following the team's 38–28 loss to FCS-school Holy Cross, head coach Randy Edsall announced he would be retiring at the end of the season. The following day, the school announced that Edsall had resigned effective immediately and defensive coordinator Lou Spanos was named the interim head coach.

On November 11, former NFL and UCLA head coach Jim L. Mora was named the school's 31st head coach beginning with the 2022 season. Shortly after the hire he helped serve as an offensive assistant for the remainder of the season.

Schedule
UConn's schedule consists of six home games and six away games for the season.

Roster

Game summaries

at Utah State

Central Connecticut

Syracuse

at No. 4 Michigan

at No. 12 NC State

Fresno State

at FIU

at Ball State

Boston College

UMass

Liberty

at Army

vs Marshall (Myrtle Beach Bowl)

References

UConn
UConn Huskies football seasons
UConn Huskies